Pavla Gajdošíková (born 4 July 1991) is a Czech actress. She won the Czech Lion Award for Best Actress in Leading Role for her performance as Ema in Mistakes.

References

External links
 

1991 births
Living people
Czech film actresses
Czech television actresses
People from Otrokovice
21st-century Czech actresses
Czech Lion Awards winners